The 2011 Urawa Red Diamonds season was Urawa Red Diamonds' eleventh consecutive season in J. League Division 1, 18th season overall in the J. League, and 45th overall in the Japanese top flight. It also includes the Emperor's Cup, and the J. League Cup.

Transfers

Winter transfers

In:

Out:

Summer transfers

In:

Out:

Goals and appearances

|}

Results

J. League Division 1

Scores are given with Urawa Reds score listed first.

1Game postponed because of Tōhoku earthquake.http://www.j-league.or.jp/images/upload/20110322/18.pdf  (in Japanese)

Emperor's Cup

J. League Cup

Scores are given with Urawa Reds score listed first.

See also
2011 J. League Division 1
2011 Emperor's Cup
2011 J. League Cup
Urawa Red Diamonds

References

External links
 Urawa Red Diamonds Official Site
 J. League Official Site

Urawa Red Diamonds
Urawa Red Diamonds seasons